La Comedia inmortal is a 1951 Argentine film directed by Catrano Catrani. The film premiered on February 9, 1951. It is about a librarian in love with a man played by Tato Bores.

Cast
Enrique Abeledo
Leo Alza
Vicente Ariño
Tato Bores
Max Citelli
Pablo Cumo
Miguel Dante
María del Río
Enrique Fava
Ricardo Lavié
Herminia Llorente
Mecha López
Paquita Muñoz
Juan Pecci
Pedro Pompillo
Isabel Pradas
Benita Puértolas
Pedro Quartucci
Hilda Rey
Judith Sulian
Juan Carlos Thorry
Aída Villadeamigo
Olga Zubarry

References

External links
 
Selected works relating to La Comedia inmortal

1951 films
1950s Spanish-language films
Argentine black-and-white films
Films directed by Catrano Catrani
Films with screenplays by Tulio Demicheli
Argentine comedy-drama films
1951 comedy-drama films
1950s Argentine films